José "Chegüi" Torres (May 3, 1936 – January 19, 2009) was a Puerto Rican-born American professional boxer. As an amateur boxer, he won a silver medal in the junior middleweight division at the 1956 Olympic Games in Melbourne. In 1965, he defeated Willie Pastrano to win the WBC, WBA and lineal light heavyweight championships. Torres trained with the legendary boxing trainer Cus D'Amato. In 1997, he was inducted into the International Boxing Hall of Fame.

Amateur career
Born in the city of Ponce, Puerto Rico, Torres began boxing when he joined the United States Army as a teenager (he was 17 years old). His only amateur titles had come in Army and Inter-Service championships, several of which he had won. Torres was still in the Army when he won the Silver Medal in the light middleweight division at the 1956 Melbourne Olympic Games, where he lost to László Papp of Hungary in the final.

Torres trained at the Empire Sporting Club in New York City with trainer Cus D'Amato.

He was the 1958 National AAU Middleweight Champion and also won the 1958 New York Golden Gloves 160 lb Open Championship.

Professional career
He debuted as a professional in 1958 with a first-round knockout of George Hamilton in New York. Twelve wins in a row followed, ten of them by knockout (including wins over contenders Ike Jenkins and Al Andrews), after which he was able to make his San Juan debut against Benny Paret, a future world welterweight champion from Cuba. Torres and Paret fought to a ten-round draw, and in 1960, Torres went back to campaigning in New York, where he scored three wins that year, all by decision, including two over Randy Sandy.

In 1961, Torres made his hometown debut with a four-round knockout win in a rematch with Hamilton at Ponce. He had six more fights that year, winning all of them by knockout.

Torres kept his knockout streak alive through 1962 with three more knockout wins but, in 1963, he suffered his first loss, being stopped in five by Cuba's Florentino Fernández, the only boxer ever to beat Torres by a knockout as a professional. After that setback, Torres went back to training and had one more fight that year, and that time around, he was able to beat another top contender in Don Fullmer, Gene Fullmer's brother, with a ten-round decision win in New Jersey.

In 1964, Torres beat a group of name boxers, including Jose Gonzalez, Walker Simmons (twice), Frankie Olivera, Gomeo Brennan and former world Middleweight champion Carl Olson (Bobo), taken out in one round. After this, Torres was ranked number 1 among Light Heavyweight challengers, and his title shot would soon arrive.

It happened in 1965 at Madison Square Garden. Torres defeated the International Boxing Hall Of Fame member, and World Light Heavyweight champion Willie Pastrano. In so doing, Torres became the third Puerto Rican world boxing champion in history and the first Latin American to win the world Light Heavyweight title, knocking Pastrano out in round nine. Later that year, he fought a non-title bout versus Tom McNeeley (father of former Mike Tyson rival Peter McNeeley) in San Juan, winning a ten-round decision.

In 1966, he successfully defended his crown three times, with 15-round decisions over Wayne Thornton and Eddie Cotton and a two-round knockout of Chic Calderwood. In his next defense, however, he would lose it to another Hall Of Fame member, Nigeria's Dick Tiger, by a decision in 15 rounds.

In 1967, he and Tiger had a rematch, and Torres lost a 15-round decision again. Many fans thought he should have won it that time, and as a consequence, a large riot followed the fight.

After his second defeat to Tiger, Torres only fought twice more, retiring after 1969.

An active retirement
In his years after retiring from boxing, he became a representative of the Puerto Rican community in New York, meeting political leaders, giving lectures and becoming the New York State Athletic Commission's Commissioner from 1984 to 1988. In 1986, he was chosen to sing the United States National Anthem before the world Lightweight championship bout between Jimmy Paul and Irleis Perez in Atlantic City, New Jersey. In 1990 he became President of the WBO, and he was President until 1995. He was also a member of the International Boxing Hall of Fame.

Author
Torres regularly contributed a column to the New York Post (which he obtained with the help of his friend, Pete Hamill), as well as to El Diario La Prensa, a Spanish language newspaper in New York City. He also wrote for The Village Voice. In 1971 he co-authored Sting Like a Bee, a biography of Muhammad Ali. In 1989, he wrote the Mike Tyson biography Fire and Fear: The Inside Story of Mike Tyson (which would be adapted into the 1995 HBO television movie Tyson).

Later years
In 2007, Torres announced his decision to move back to his hometown of Ponce, Puerto Rico and concentrate on writing books and articles related to sports and history. On August 6, 2008, Torres received a recognition for his military career.

Death and legacy
Torres died in the morning of January 19, 2009, of a heart attack at his home in Ponce, Puerto Rico. There are plans to move his remains to the Panteón Nacional Román Baldorioty de Castro, a national pantheon and museum, in Ponce, Puerto Rico.  He is also recognized at Ponce's Parque de los Ponceños Ilustres in the area of sports. During his life Torres was the subject of two documentaries by famed Japanese film director Hiroshi Teshigahara.

Professional boxing record

See also

List of world light-heavyweight boxing champions
List of Puerto Rican boxing world champions
Sports in Puerto Rico
Afro–Puerto Ricans

References

External links

José Torres - CBZ Profile

 

 
 

|-

|-

1936 births
2009 deaths
Puerto Rican male boxers
Sportspeople from Ponce, Puerto Rico
Burials at Panteón Nacional Román Baldorioty de Castro
Puerto Rican Army personnel
United States Army soldiers
New York State Athletic Commissioners
American male boxers
Medalists at the 1956 Summer Olympics
Olympic silver medalists for the United States in boxing
Olympic boxers of the United States
Boxers at the 1956 Summer Olympics
International Boxing Hall of Fame inductees
Winners of the United States Championship for amateur boxers
Light-heavyweight boxers
World light-heavyweight boxing champions
World Boxing Association champions
World Boxing Council champions
The Ring (magazine) champions